The 2000 St Helens Metropolitan Borough Council election took place on 4 May 2000 to elect members of St Helens Metropolitan Borough Council in Merseyside, England. One third of the council was up for election and the Labour party stayed in overall control of the council.

After the election, the composition of the council was
Labour 35
Liberal Democrats 15
Conservative 4

Election result
Labour remained in control of the council with 35 seats, but suffered a net loss of 2 seats. The Liberal Democrats increased their share of the vote and gained Moss Bank and Sutton and Bold from Labour, but lost Newton West back to Labour, to leave the party on 15 seats. Meanwhile, the Conservatives also gained a seat from Labour in Windle, defeating the mayor Pat Jackson, while the leader of the Conservative group Betty Lowe held her seat in Rainford to leave the Conservatives with 4 councillors.

Turnout in 4 wards was at or below 16%, while the highest turnout was in Rainford at 35.7%. The turnout in St Helens was an increase from the last election, which was put down to a trial of early voting on the Friday and Saturday before the election in 6 wards.

Ward results

References

2000 English local elections
2000
2000s in Merseyside